Husasău de Tinca is a commune in Bihor County, Crișana, Romania with a population of 2,395 people. It is composed of five villages: Fonău (Rózsafalva), Husasău de Tinca, Miersig (Nyárszeg), Oșand (Vasand) and Sititelec (Székelytelek).

References

Communes in Bihor County
Localities in Crișana